ARCO Arena (originally called the Sacramento Sports Arena and sometimes referred to as the Original ARCO Arena or ARCO Arena I to distinguish it from its successor) was an indoor arena in Sacramento, California. It was the NBA's smallest arena as it held just 10,333 people and was built in 1985 to temporarily accommodate the NBA's Sacramento Kings, who had relocated from Kansas City. The arena's first event was a fashion show on September 12, 1985. The arena also hosted boxing matches.

The idea to move the Kings to the building was first pitched in late 1984, with the building being described as a "warehouse under construction" by the Sacramento Bee. The arena cost $12 million to build.

Located north of Sacramento's downtown, ARCO Arena was nicknamed "The Madhouse on Market Street", and Kings games in this small venue were 100% sold out. Its official name of "ARCO Arena" is believed to be the first example of an NBA team selling naming rights to a brand new facility: in this case, rights were sold to the Atlantic Richfield Company, which is now a subsidiary of Marathon Petroleum. The Kings sold the naming rights for $5 million over ten years in August 1985, which included the naming rights for the new arena.

The Kings left this building in 1988 to move to the new ARCO Arena, built one mile (1.6 km) to the west. The structure survived as an office building for Sprint Communications. On December 19, 2005, the California Department of Consumer Affairs moved their headquarters into the building.

References

External links
Ballparks.com – ARCO Arena I
Photos of the original ARCO Arena

Basketball venues in California
Music venues in California
Sports venues in Sacramento, California
Defunct basketball venues in the United States
Sacramento Kings venues
Sports venues completed in 1985
1988 disestablishments in California
Former National Basketball Association venues
1985 establishments in California
Defunct indoor arenas in California